Stary Dor is a rural locality (a village) in Komyanskoye Rural Settlement, Gryazovetsky District, Vologda Oblast, Russia. The population was 26 as of 2002.

Geography 
Stary Dor is located 25 km north of Gryazovets (the district's administrative centre) by road. Podsosenye is the nearest rural locality.

References 

Rural localities in Gryazovetsky District